"On My Journey Now, Mount Zion" is a spiritual popularized by Paul Robeson.

Recordings
The Fairfield Four "On My Journey Now/Love Like a River", Dot, 1950
Paul Robeson 1960
The Weavers 1964
Nat Adderley, on Live at Memory Lane

Lloyd L. Brown. 1997  published a partial biography, The Young Paul Robeson: On My Journey Now (Westview Press.)

References

Gospel songs
Year of song unknown